Davíð  is an Icelandic masculine given name and may refer to:

 Sigmundur Davíð Gunnlaugsson (born 1975), Icelandic politician and chairman of the Progressive Party
 Davíð Oddsson (born 1948), Icelandic politician, Prime Minister of Iceland from 1991 to 2004
 Davíð Kristján Ólafsson (born 1995), Icelandic footballer 
 Davíð Stefánsson (1895–1964), famous Icelandic poet and novelist, best known as a poet of humanity
 Davíð Viðarsson (born 1984), Icelandic football midfielder

Icelandic masculine given names

is:Davíð